Sydney Football Club is an Australian professional association football club based in Moore Park, Sydney. The club was formed in 2004. They became the first member from the NSW admitted into the A-League along with the Central Coast Mariners and the Newcastle Jets.

In the 2010s, Sydney FC were the dominant side of Australia, winning three league premierships, three league championships and one, however also finishing 5th and lower in 5 out of the 10 seasons in the 2010s FFA Cup.

Key
Key to league competitions:

 A-League Men – Australia's top soccer league, established in 2005

Key to colours and symbols:

Key to league record:
 Season = The year and article of the season
 Pos = Final position
 Pld = Games played
 W = Games won
 D = Games drawn
 L = Games lost
 GF = Goals scored
 GA = Goals against
 Pts = Points

Key to cup record:
 En-dash (—) = Sydney FC did not participate or cup not held
 DNQ = Did not qualify
 DNE = The club did not enter cup play
 GS = Group stage
 R32 = Round of 32
 R16 = Round of 16
 QF = Quarter-finals
 SF = Semi-finals
 RU = Runners-up
 W = Winners

Seasons

Footnotes

References

General

External links

 
Seasons
Australian soccer club seasons
Sydney-sport-related lists